Salling Group A/S (until 1 June 2018 Dansk Supermarked A/S) is Denmark's largest retailer, with a market share of 34.9%. It owns several chains of stores - Netto, Basalt, Føtex, Bilka and Salling. All of these chains operate exclusively in Denmark except Netto, which has expanded into Germany, and Poland, and has made two unsuccessful attempts at operating in the United Kingdom. Its stores in Sweden were sold off in 2019.

Herman Salling founded Jysk Supermarked in 1960. Dansk Supermarked A/S was formed when Salling partnered with the A.P. Møller-Mærsk Group in 1964.

On 1 June 2018 Dansk Supermarked changed its name to Salling Group.

History

The early years
The Danish Supermarket was built on the foundation of the Salling department store, created in 1906 by Ferdinand Salling. He worked there until his death in 1953 and he managed to transform his company into public limited company - F. Salling A/S.

After the death of Ferdinand Salling, his son Herman Salling took over the company. He travelled all over the world in search for inspiration and new ideas. After that he decided to focus on department stores, supermarkets and hypermarket chains.

In 1960, Herman Salling opened his first supermarket store Føtex, through his company Jysk Supermarket, which was a completely new type of store for Denmark. The idea behind that store was to provide both food and textiles under one roof.

Despite the fact that Føtex is the oldest store in the Dansk Supermarked Group, it has never stopped growing. In 2007, the company decided to open a Føtex food store, which will offer only quality food and in 2009 the first stores was opened in the Skæring by Aarhus and Hasseris by Aalborg. Today, there are 88 Føtex food stores all over Denmark.

A.P. Møller enters Dansk Supermarked
Herman Salling wanted to expand his venture across Europe, so he started looking for partners to provide him extra funding.

Salling found the right partner in 1964 and he made a deal with Arnold Peter Møller, which acquired 50% of the company off him. Møller also suggested that Herman Salling's company - Jysk Supermarket, should change its name to Danish Supermarket A/S.

The birth of Bilka
In 1970, Danish Supermarked gave the Danes the first discount store in Denmark - Bilka. The first store was located in Tilst, near Aarhus. After the opening of the store, there were more than 50,000 people visiting it every day.

At this point, the customers were becoming more and more price conscious. Some of them even had extra freezers at their homes, so that they could buy more goods at the discount store.

The idea for the creation of Bilka came from Herman Salling's visit to West Germany. After that he managed to convince his partner, the shipping magnate Mærsk Mc-Kinney Møller, that hypermarkets were the way forward.

The launch of Netto
In 1981, the first store of the discount supermarket chain Netto was opened in Denmark. The company later expanded into France, Germany, Poland, Sweden and the United Kingdom. Netto is the only company owned by Dansk Supermarked to have expanded outside Denmark.

The German Netto stores, set up in 1990, were originally a 75:25 joint venture between Dansk Supermarked and the largest German supermarket chain, Edeka. Dansk Supermarked acquired Edeka's 25% stake in January 2013, enabling it to become a wholly owned subsidiary of Dansk Supermarked. Edeka also owns a separate discount supermarket chain, Netto Marken-Discount, which is completely unrelated to Dansk Supermarked.

The United Kingdom Netto stores, also set up in 1990, were later sold to the British supermarket chain Asda, (owned by the United States retailer Walmart), in 2010. However, in 2014, Dansk Supermarked relaunched Netto UK stores as a 50:50 joint venture with another British supermarket chain, J Sainsbury plc. In 2016 J Sainsbury plc closed cooperation with DS and again Netto chain left British market.

The Swedish Netto stores were established in 2002 as a 50:50 joint venture with the Swedish retailer ICA AB. However, ICA later reduced its stake to 5%, meaning that from 2006 Dansk Supermarked had a 95% controlling interest in the Swedish Netto stores. Netto left Sweden in July 2019, when the stores were sold off to Co-op Butiker & Stormarknader AB.

Expansion into other ventures
Tøj & Sko, a clothing and footwear retailer, was also founded in 1981. The stores were closed in 2012.

Dansk Supermarked also launched another non-food only retailer, A-Z, in 1987. However, by 2014, these stores had been transferred to the Bilka brand.

Mærsk sells its stake back to Salling
As of January 2014, the company was 81% owned by F. Salling Invest A/S and F. Salling Holding A/S (known as the Salling Companies) and 19% owned by A.P. Moller-Maersk Group. On 7 January 2014, A.P. Møller - Mærsk A/S announced that it was selling a 48.68% stake in Dansk Supermarked back to F. Salling Invest A/S and F. Salling Holding A/S (jointly the "Salling Companies"), with an option to buy back the remaining 19% stake in 2019. The remaining stake was bought earlier than expected at the end of 2017.

Campaigns

Mini Market 
The Mini Market (in Danish: Mini Marked) campaign was a largely successful campaign done by Salling Group in the summer of 2019. The campaign revolved around miniature toys shaped and designed like grocery products, such as a toothpaste bottle, a carton of eggs or a deodorant. Customers would receive one of the toys if they purchased more than 100 kr. worth of groceries in a Salling, Føtex or Bilka store. Along with the toys was a collection binder that customers could purchase at stores. It was expected that the toys would be sold until July 4, however because of the popularity, the expected end date was then June 27.

The campaign also received criticism. Throughout the campaign, they received complaints because of the large amounts of plastic they were producing. In response, the press manager for Salling Group, Mads Hvitved Grand, stated that the toys' intention for a long period of use was best met with plastic, and that the company wanted to promote playing with physical toys instead of sitting in front of a screen.

Current operations
Salling Group is Denmark's largest retailer, with a 34.9% market share.

Current chains
The store chains owned by Salling Group are:

Netto - discount supermarkets
Føtex - large supermarkets (with many non-food items)
Føtex Home Delivery - home delivery to customer
Bilka - hypermarkets
Salling - department stores
Basalt - ultra-discount (prices 15% under "normal" discount stores;no frozen or cold food;shorter opening hours) from Tuesday 11 October 2022 Kastrup, Amager

As of 2007 the total number of stores was 1,171.

Current stores
Current stores and supermarkets in Denmark:

Former operations

Former chains
Salling Group also formerly operated the following chains:
A-Z - non-food only retailer
Tøj & Sko - clothing and footwear stores

Former stores
Former stores in Denmark:

References

External links
Official website
Netto official website
Føtex official website
Bilka official website
Salling official website

 
Danish companies established in 1964
Retail companies of Denmark
Companies based in Aarhus
Dansk Supermarked
Retail companies established in 1964